Haji Ghulam Hassan Khan is an Indian politician from the union territory of Ladakh.

He was born on 11 December 1936 at Silmo a village of Batalik, Kargil. He married Zeben Nissa on 18 December 1963, and he has a Bachelor's degree in Arts from the University of Kashmir.

Political career

 1999, was elected to 13th Lok Sabha.
 1999-2000, served as a Member, Committee on Transport and Tourism Member, Committee on Science and Technology, Environment and Forests.
 2000-2004, served as a Member, Consultative Committee, Ministry of Defence.
 2009, was re-elected to 15th Lok Sabha (2nd term) on 31 Aug.
 2009, was a Member, Committee on Labour.

In the 15th Lok Sabha elections, over denial of mandate by the National Conference he fought against the Congress candidate in Ladakh as an independent candidate and won. Though later he announced his decision to return to the National Conference at a news conference, termed by JKNC chief Dr. Farooq Abdullah as his "Homecoming" however due to political circumstances he had to clarify later on that he would be only lending unconditional support to the UPA and won't be re- joining the JKNC. Even today(2013) he is recorded as an Independent MP in the Lok Sabha records.

In September 2013 he contested as a councilor and won from Silmo constituency in the 3rd General elections of the LAHDC Kargil. It was his case that brought to the front the peculiarity in the LAHDC Act 1995 as he holds the seat of a councilor and is yet to resign as the Member of Parliament, Ladakh.

See also
 Leh
 Kargil district

References

1936 births
Living people
India MPs 2009–2014
India MPs 1999–2004
Lok Sabha members from Jammu and Kashmir
People from Ladakh
People from Kargil district
Independent politicians in India
Jammu & Kashmir National Conference politicians
Ladakhi people
University of Kashmir alumni
Ladakh politicians